The first cabinet of Petre P. Carp was the government of Romania from 7 July 1900 to 13 February 1901.

Ministers
The ministers of the cabinet were as follows:

President of the Council of Ministers:
Petre P. Carp (7 July 1900 - 13 February 1901)
Minister of the Interior: 
Constantin Olănescu (7 July 1900 - 13 February 1901)
Minister of Foreign Affairs: 
Alexandru Marghiloman (7 July 1900 - 13 February 1901)
Minister of Finance:
Petre P. Carp (7 July 1900 - 13 February 1901)
Minister of Justice:
Titu Maiorescu (7 July 1900 - 13 February 1901)
Minister of War:
Gen. Iacob Lahovari (7 July 1900 - 13 February 1901)
Minister of Religious Affairs and Public Instruction:
Constantin C. Arion (7 July 1900 - 13 February 1901)
Minister of Public Works:
Ion C. Grădișteanu (7 July 1900 - 13 February 1901)
Minister of Agriculture, Industry, Commerce, and Property:
Nicolae Filipescu (7 July 1900 - 13 February 1901)

References

Cabinets of Romania
Cabinets established in 1900
Cabinets disestablished in 1901
1900 establishments in Romania
1901 disestablishments in Romania